Koech is a Kalenjin surname of Kenyan origin that may refer to:
Benjamin Koech (20 June), A track and field champion known for going to the Olympics in 1992 in Barcelona
Benson Koech (born 1974), Kenyan middle-distance runner is known for his achievements as a young athlete
Bernard Kiprop Koech (born 1988), Kenyan marathon runner
Cherono Koech, Kenyan middle-distance runner
Duncan Koech (born 1984), Kenyan marathon runner
Enock Koech (born 1981), Kenyan long-distance runner
Isaiah Kiplangat Koech (born 1993), Kenyan long-distance runner who specializes in the 5000  meters
Job Koech Kinyor (born 1990), Kenyan middle-distance runner
John Koech, Kenyan politician
Joyce Chepchumba Koech (born 1970), long-distance athlete from Kenya
Justus Koech (born 1980), Kenyan middle-distance runner who specializes in the 800  meters
Paul Kipsiele Koech (born 1981), a Kenyan runner who specializes in the 3000  meters steeplechase
Paul Koech (1969–2018), Kenyan distance and marathon runner
Peter Koech (born 1958), a former long-distance runner from Kenya, Olympic silver medallist in the 3,000  meters steeplechase
Wesley Kiprotich Koech (born 1979), Kenyan middle-distance runner who specializes in the 3000  meters steeplechase
William Koech (born 1961), retired Kenyan long-distance runner who specialized in the 10,000 metres

See also
Kech (disambiguation)
Koch (disambiguation)
Kipkoech, related surname meaning "son of Koech"
Jepkoech, related surname meaning "daughter of Koech"

Kalenjin names